The Fennville AVA is an American Viticultural Area located in Allegan County, Michigan.  Entirely contained within the larger Lake Michigan Shore AVA, the Fennville AVA borders Lake Michigan on the west, the Kalamazoo River on the north, a game reserve to the east, and the Black River on the south.   The soil in the Fennville area is different from surrounding areas, primarily glacial sandy soils.  The area's climate is moderated by the nearby Lake Michigan, and few days in the summer growing season exceed .  Grape growers in the area have had success with both Vitis vinifera and Vitis labrusca wine grapes. The hardiness zone is 6a.

References 

Geography of Allegan County, Michigan
American Viticultural Areas
Michigan wine
1981 establishments in Michigan